The Vicariate Apostolic of Guapi in the Catholic Church is located in the town of Guapi, Cauca in Colombia.

History
On 5 April 1954 Pope Pius XII established the Prefecture Apostolic of Guapi from the Prefecture Apostolic of Tumaco.  Blessed John Paul II elevated it to a Vicariate Apostolic on 13 February 2001.

Ordinaries
José de Jesús Arango, O.F.M. † (23 Apr 1954 – 1969) Died
José Miguel López Hurtado, O.F.M. † (28 Nov 1969 – 1982) Resigned
Alberto Lee López, O.F.M. † (8 Mar 1985 – 1992) Died
Rafael Morales Duque, O.F.M. † (5 May 1994 – 13 Feb 2001) Resigned
Hernán Alvarado Solano † (13 Feb 2001 – 31 Jan 2011) Died
Carlos Alberto Correa Martínez (3 Dec 2013 - )

See also
Roman Catholicism in Colombia

Sources

Apostolic vicariates
Roman Catholic dioceses in Colombia
Christian organizations established in 1954